Alhazred may refer to:

 Abdul Alhazred, a fictional character created by American horror writer H. P. Lovecraft
 Alhazred (novel), a 2006 novel by Cthulhu Mythos writer Donald Tyson